{{Infobox election
| election_name      = 2006 Arizona's 8th congressional district election
| country            = Arizona 
| type               = presidential
| ongoing            = no
| previous_election  = 2004 United States House of Representatives elections in Arizona#District 8
| previous_year      = 2004
| next_election      = 2008 United States House of Representatives elections in Arizona#District 8
| next_year          = 2008
| election_date      = November 7, 2006
| image1             = 
| nominee1           = Gabby Giffords
| running_mate1      = 
| party1             = Democratic Party (United States)
| popular_vote1      = 137,655
| percentage1        = 54.26%
| image2             = 
| nominee2           = Randy Graf
| running_mate2      = 
| party2             = Republican Party (United States)
| popular_vote2      = 106,790
| percentage2        = 42.09%
| map_image          = 
| map_size           = 
| map_caption        =
| title              = U.S. Representative 
| before_election    = Jim Kolbe
| before_party       = Republican Party (United States)
| after_election     = Gabby Giffords
| after_party        = Democratic Party (United States)
}}

The 2006 Arizona 8th congressional district election' was an election for the United States House of Representatives for the open seat of incumbent Republican Jim Kolbe, who was not running for re-election.  The primary was held on September 12, 2006, and the two major party winners were Republican Randy Graf, a former state Representative who challenged Kolbe for the GOP nomination in 2004, and former State Senator Gabby Giffords.  Libertarian Dave Nolan, who was uncontested in the primary, was also in the November 7, 2006 general election.  Graf was considered too conservative for the district: Kolbe withheld his endorsement, and towards the end of the election the National GOP pulled their support.  By election time, most non-partisan analyses considered this race the most likely district to switch hands, which it did, as Giffords won a decisive victory, 54% to 42%.

Primary

Candidates
Frank Antenori (Republican), U.S. Army veteran
Gabby Giffords (Democratic), former state senator
Randy Graf (Republican), former state representative
Mike Hellon (Republican), former chair of the Arizona Republican Party
Steve Huffman (Republican), state representative
Michael T. Jenkins (Republican), automobile repair shop owner
William Daniel Johnson (Democratic), white nationalist activist
Jeffrey Lynn Latas (Democratic), U.S. Air Force veteran
David F. Nolan (Libertarian), co-founder of the Libertarian Party
Patty Weiss (Democratic), television anchor
Alex Rodriguez (Democratic), member of the Tucson Unified School District board
Francine Shacter (Democratic), former Democratic precinct chairwoman

Republican campaign
Incumbent Republican Jim Kolbe announced on November 23, 2005, that he would not seek re-election in 2006. The district, located in Southeastern Arizona and based in the suburbs of Tucson, was Republican-leaning, but competitive: George W. Bush had won the district with 53% of the vote in 2004 (although only 50% in 2000).  Kolbe had barely won the seat in 1984, but had usually skated to reelection since then.  Even after coming out as gay in 1996, he remained very popular in the district, taking 61% of the vote in 2004. Although Kolbe was generally thought to be all but unbeatable in the district, it was widely believed that it would be very competitive once Kolbe retired.

Randy Graf, the primary winner, left a leadership position in the state House in 2004 to challenge Kolbe in the Republican primary. Graf had won 40 percent of the vote and had campaigned almost full-time since.  A supporter of the Minuteman Project, Graf campaigned on a pledge to ensure that illegal immigrants had no path to citizenship and that the border would be further secured.  Graf previously sponsored a bill (which did not pass) to allow patrons carry guns into bars and restaurants.

The GOP establishment, however, considered Graf as too conservative for a district that leaned Republican but gave President Bush only 53 percent of the votes in 2004, and tried to rally voters around state representative Steve Huffman. However, another more moderate candidate, former Arizona Republican Party chairman Mike Hellon, also gained significant support, which split anti-Graf support and prevented Huffman from consolidating the moderate lane.

Huffman got a boost when the national GOP took the rare step of endorsing and supporting Huffman, putting $250,000 into the race.  The other GOP candidates criticized the move as unfair.  In the meantime, the national Democratic party jumped in and spent nearly $200,000, a large part of that for advertisements critical of Huffman in an effort to help Graf's candidacy.

Huffman's campaign was injured when, according to CQPolitics: "there were allegations that his (Huffman's) campaign treasurer, local real estate broker William Arnold, had stalked Hellon’s ex-wife, state Sen. Toni Hellon". Arnold quit as treasurer after Hellon obtained a restraining order against him, and Huffman’s campaign said it had no involvement in Arnold’s actions." The scandal expanded when it was revealed that unauthorised photos of Toni Hellon had been posted to a website owned by the same individual who had designed Huffman's campaign website. As a result of the incident, the Tucson Weekly withdrew its support for Huffman.

Democratic campaign
Gabby Giffords, who was former State Senator, resigned from the Arizona Legislature just eight days after Kolbe's announcement, in order to run for his seat.  She quickly established herself as the front-runner, largely on the basis of her legislative record. She also gained some beneficial publicity when it was revealed that she was engaged to space shuttle astronaut Mark Kelly.  Her only serious competition was longtime KVOA television newscaster Patty Weiss, who ran as a more liberal alternative to Giffords.

Results 

	

	

 General election

Candidates
Gabby Giffords (Democratic), former state senator
Randy Graf (Republican), former state representative
David F. Nolan (Libertarian), co-founder of the Libertarian Party
Jay Quick (Independent), geologist and businessman
Russ Dove (Write-in), militiaman and convicted felon
Leo F. Kimminau (Write-in)
Paul Price (Write-in)

Campaign
Graf's campaign got off to a rough start in mid-September when outgoing Republican incumbent Jim Kolbe withheld his endorsement, citing "profound and fundamental differences" between their views.  The Arizona Republic wrote that a "victory by Graf would in effect repudiate much of Kolbe's work on what has come to be known as 'comprehensive' immigration reform. In contrast with 'enforcement only,' Kolbe’s plan would create a guest-worker program and an opportunity for undocumented residents to become citizens eventually."

In mid-August CQPolitics changed their rating of the race from "Leans Republican" to "No Clear Favorite".

By late September, Graf's position had continued to deteriorate. The Cook Political Report'' changed their rating from "Toss Up" to "Leans Democratic", and the national Republican Party cancelled about $1 million in advertising support. Two days later, in what was seen as a diminished level of national influence and interest in what had long been considered a competitive race, the national Democratic party also pulled their financial support.

Debates

Polling
On September 20, 2006, Gabby Giffords' campaign released an internal poll that showed her leading Republican candidate Randy Graf by 19 percentage points. The poll showed Giffords with 54% of the vote and Graf with 35%. The poll was based on responses from 500 likely general election voters and had a +/-4% margin of error.

Results from a second poll conducted during the same time period confirmed a Giffords lead while suggesting a slightly tighter race. This independent poll, conducted by 1 to 1 Direct and Marketing Intelligence, showed Giffords with a 12-point lead (Giffords [48], Graf [36], +/-4% MoE).

On October 4, Zogby released a poll showing Giffords with a 45–37 percent lead.

Endorsements

Results 
Giffords was declared the winner 37 minutes after the polls closed. Graf conceded defeat at 10:08 P.M. EST.

References

External links 
Giffords campaign website
Graf campaign site 
Nolan campaign site

Arizona 8
2006 8
United States House of Representatives 8
Gabby Giffords